Aq Jalu (also Romanized as Āq Jalū; also known as Āqā Jalū) is a village in Rahmatabad Rural District, Zarqan District, Shiraz County, Fars Province, Iran. At the 2006 census, its population was 79, in 20 families.

References 

Populated places in Zarqan County